Tezgam is a daily express train service between Karachi and Rawalpindi in Pakistan. Tezgam means "fast runner". It is one of the oldest and popular trains of Pakistan. It was started in 1950s between Karachi and Peshawar. Later its route was shortened to Karachi and Rawalpindi.

Tezgam has Economy, AC Business and AC Sleeper accommodation. It covers  distance from Karachi to Rawalpindi in 25 hours and 30 minutes.

On 31 October 2019, A Tezgam express train caught fire after a gas cylinder brought on to the train by a passenger exploded. The fire engulfed three carriages, killing at least 74 people and injuring 40 more. An investigation has begun.

Route
Karachi to Rawalpindi via Hyderabad, Rohri, Bahawalpur, Multan, and Lahore
 
 Karachi Cantt
 Hyderabad Jn
 Tando Adam
 Nawabshah
 Mehrabpur
 Khairpur
 Rohri Jn
 Khanpur
 Bahawalpur
 Multan Cantt
 Khanewal Jn
 Mian Channu
 Chichawatni
 Sahiwal
 Okara CITY
 Pattoki
 Raiwind Jn
 Lahore Jn
 Gujranwala
 Wazirabad
 Gujrat
 Lalamusa Jn
 Jhelum
 Gujar Khan
 Rawalpindi

External links
Tezgam Time Table 2021

References 

Named passenger trains of Pakistan
Passenger trains in Pakistan